Darcy Lussick (born 6 June 1989) is an Australian professional rugby league footballer who plays as a  for Featherstone Rovers in the RFL Championship, on loan from Betfred Super League side Salford Red Devils.

He previously played for the Manly Warringah Sea Eagles in two separate spells and the Parramatta Eels in the NRL. Lussick also played for the Toronto Wolfpack in the Betfred Championship and the Super League.

Background
Lussick was born in Sydney, New South Wales, Australia.

Early career
Lussick played his junior football for the Beacon Hill Bears. He also played for the Manly-Warringah Sea Eagles S.G. Ball side in 2007.

Club career

Manly Warringah
Lussick made his debut game in round 14 2011 against the North Queensland Cowboys, a game which Manly ran out easy 24-4 winners at Brookvale Oval against the previously in-form Cowboys. Lussick is also known for his part in the "Battle of Brookvale" which resulted in a three match suspension.  Manly would go on to be premiers in 2011 but Lussick played no part in the club's finals campaign or the 2011 NRL Grand Final.

Parramatta
On 14 June 2012, Lussick signed a 3-year deal with the Parramatta Eels. Lussick won the Ken Thornett NRL Players' Player Medal. At the Eels Lussick become an ambassador for Midas, The Kellyville Bushrangers and made an appearance on The Footy Show.

2013 saw Lussick win multiple players' players awards. At the end of the 2013 season Lussick had an over due groin operation which he played most of the season with. In Lussick's first year at the Parramatta Eels he won the prestigious Ken Thornett NRL Players' Player Medal 2013.

In March 2014, Lussick was suspended for 4 matches due to a tackle on a Sydney Roosters player, Jared Waerea-Hargreaves.

At the end of his playing time with Parramatta, Lussick had played 53 games and had scored no tries.  He was also a member of the Parramatta side which finished last in 2013.

Return to Manly-Warringah
On 18 August 2015, Lussick signed a three-year contract to return to the Manly-Warringah Sea Eagles starting in 2016.

On 21 May 2017, Lussick was sin binned for an illegal shoulder charge on a North Sydney player when he was playing for Blacktown Workers Sea Eagles against North Sydney at North Sydney Oval.

On 16 July 2017, while Lussick was playing for the Manly-Warringah Sea Eagles against the Wests Tigers, Lussick pulled Wests Tigers captain Aaron Woods' hair. Lussick was charged with contrary conduct by the NRL, entered an early guilty plea, and was fined $1350.

On 23 July 2017, Lussick was sin binned in Manly's 52–22 loss against the St George Illawarra Dragons for punching St George player Jack De Belin.

Toronto Wolfpack
On 21 April 2018, Lussick left Manly to join The Toronto Wolfpack.  It was reported that Lussick departed the club due to coach Trent Barrett's refusal to pick him for the first grade side despite being fit and had overcome his injuries.  It was also reported that Lussick and Barrett had a verbal altercation at training in the lead up to Lussick's departure.

On 7 October, Lussick played in Toronto's 4–2 defeat against London Broncos in the Million Pound Game.

In 2019, Lussick played in Toronto's Million Pound Game victory over Featherstone to secure promotion to the Super League for the first time.

Salford Red Devils
On 1 January 2021, it was reported that Lussick had signed for Salford.

In round 8 of the 2021 Super League season, he scored his first try for Salford but was later sent to the sin bin for a dangerous high tackle in the club's 62-18 loss.

Featherstone Rovers (loan)
On 7 June 2021, it was reported that he had signed for Featherstone Rovers in the RFL Championship on loan.

Boxing career
On 7 December 2019, Lussick made his boxing debut against former NRL player Justin Hodges.  Lussick won in his debut fight knocking out Hodges in the first 39 seconds of the bout. Lussick fought Paul Gallen in his second professional bout on December 22, 2021,
putting up a brave effort but was outclassed and gassed in the first round, ultimately leading to a second round KO for Gallen

Personal life
Lussick was named as CareFlight Ambassador, the Parramatta Eels new charity partner for 2014. Darcy is the older brother of Joey Lussick who plays  with the Parramatta Eels.

References

External links
Toronto Wolfpack profile
Manly Sea Eagles profile
Sea Eagles profile
NRL profile

1989 births
Living people
Australian rugby league players
Australian expatriate sportspeople in England
Australian expatriate sportspeople in Canada
Featherstone Rovers players
Manly Warringah Sea Eagles players
New South Wales City Origin rugby league team players
Parramatta Eels players
People educated at St Joseph's College, Hunters Hill
Rugby league props
Rugby league locks
Rugby league players from Sydney
Salford Red Devils players
Sunshine Coast Sea Eagles players
Toronto Wolfpack players
Australian expatriate rugby league players
Expatriate rugby league players in England